A temperance movement is a social movement urging reduced or prohibited use of alcoholic beverages.

Temperance movements by country
Australia
Canada
Ireland
New Zealand
Sri Lanka
Sweden
The United Kingdom
The United States
Washingtonian movement

Temperance movements by religion
Catholic temperance movement
Woman's Christian Temperance Union

Temperance movement may also refer to:
The Temperance Movement (band)
The Temperance Movement (album)

See also
Temperance (disambiguation)
Neo-prohibitionism